Slowpoke Rodríguez  ("Lento Rodríguez" in Spanish, though some more recent translations call him "Tranquilino") is a fictional animated cartoon mouse, part of the Looney Tunes' cast.

History and personality
He is described as "the slowest mouse in all México" from the countryside of Mexico, and is a cousin to Speedy Gonzales, who is known as the fastest. However, he mentions to his cousin that while he may be best known for his slow feet, he's not slow in "la cabeza" (the head). He speaks in a monotone voice and seems to never be surprised by anything. Due to being slow he is generally, unlike Speedy, unable to outrun the pursuing cats who try to capture the both of them, but he is shown to have alternative (more effective) methods of resistance such as his possession of a gun.

Cartoon appearances
Slowpoke only appeared in two cartoons alongside his cousin. The first, "Mexicali Shmoes" (1959), ends with two lazy cats, José and Manuel, the former learning the hard way that Slowpoke carries a gun (though the gun bit has been edited out of this cartoon in recent years). The second, "Mexican Boarders" (1962), revolves around Speedy trying to protect Slowpoke from Sylvester the Cat, but in the end, Slowpoke demonstrates his ability to hypnotize Sylvester into becoming his slave. The other mice comment at this point that "Slowpoke Rodríguez may be the slowest mouse in all Mexico, but he has the Evil Eye!"

Other appearances
Slowpoke makes an appearance as a plot catalyst in the Super NES video game Speedy Gonzales: Los Gatos Bandidos.
Slowpoke also appears alongside Speedy in a commercial for Virgin Media's broadband service in the UK, voiced by Kerry Shale.
Slowpoke appears in The Looney Tunes Show episode "The Black Widow", voiced by Hugh Davidson. While his relation to Speedy Gonzales remains intact, he is depicted as the Sheriff of Tacapulco. After Daffy Duck and Porky Pig are arrested for streaking, Sheriff Slowpoke Rodríguez allows them to make a call. As Daffy Duck was unable to get through to Bugs Bunny (who was helping Lola Bunny return a diamond that she unintentionally stole from the museum at the time), he asks Sheriff Slowpoke if he would mind that he tries to call someone else. Daffy gets through to Speedy Gonzales who speeds all the way to Tacapulco to negotiate their release. Once that was done, Sheriff Slowpoke invites Daffy, Porky, and Speedy to join in Tacapulco's fiesta.

References

Fictional mice and rats
Looney Tunes characters
Fictional Mexican people
Male characters in animation
Stereotypes of Hispanic and Latino people
Ethnic humour
Film characters introduced in 1959
Animated characters introduced in 1959